Asterism may refer to:

 Asterism (astronomy), a pattern of stars
 Asterism (gemology), an optical phenomenon in gemstones
 Asterism (typography), (⁂) a moderately rare typographical symbol denoting a break in passages

See also
 
 
 Aster (disambiguation)